Dos Hermanas is a village located in the General Manuel Belgrano Department in the Misiones Province in northeastern Argentina. The area corresponds to mountains of more than 700 meters of altitude, being the highest part of the province.

References

Populated places in Misiones Province